Muhimbili University of Health and Allied Sciences (MUHAS) is a public university in Dar es Salaam, Tanzania. It is accredited by the Tanzania Commission for Universities (TCU).

Location
As of June 2018, the university had two campuses:

 The Main Campus along United Nations Road, in Upanga West, in the city of Dar es Salaam.

This campus hosts a 571-bed, start-of-art teaching hospital.

 The university also maintains a student hostel located along Chole Road, Masaki, in Dar es Salaam.

History
The Muhimbili University of Health and Allied Sciences traces its origins to 1963, when it opened as Dar es Salaam Medical School. The school became the faculty of medicine of the University of Dar es Salaam, in 1968. In 1976 the Faculty of Medicine was incorporated into Muhimbili Hospital to form the Muhimbili Medical Centre (MMC).

The Parliament Act No. 9 of 1991, upgraded the faculty to a college of Dar es Salaam; the Muhimbili University College of Health Sciences (MUCHS). In 2000 the Government by Act of Parliament dis-established MMC and created two closely linked, but autonomous public institutions: MUCHS and the Muhimbili National Hospital (MNH). Over the years MUCHS made significant achievements in increased student enrollment and development of several new academic programmes. The Parliament Act No. 9 of 1991 that established MUCHS was repealed in 2005. In 2007, MUHAS was established by Article 1 of the Charter of Incorporation, in line with the recommendations of the Tanzania Commission of Universities.

Research
Research features prominently in the institutional focus of the Muhimbili University of Health and Allied Sciences. The university is engaged in over 40 major research endeavours. They range from ‘vitamin trials among the children of HIV-infected women’ to an examination of ‘health insurance in developing countries’ and from a study of the ‘social and contextual predictors of male heterosexual risk behavior in Africa’ to one that looks at ‘the effect of multivitamin supplements on clinical and immunological response in childhood tuberculosis’. Research partners include the European Union and several European and American universities.

Programmes
Muhimbili University of Health and Allied Sciences offers programmes in Medicine, Ophthalmology, Dentistry, Pharmacy, Nursing, Public Health, Traditional Medicine, Laboratory and Allied Sciences at undergraduate and postgraduate levels.

Notable faculty members
Julie Makani, haematologist

See also
:Category:Muhimbili University of Health and Allied Sciences alumni

References

External links
 
Southern African University

Public universities in Tanzania
Universities in Dar es Salaam
Educational institutions established in 1963
1963 establishments in Tanganyika